

The Aeromot AMT-100 Ximango is a Brazilian motor glider developed from the Fournier RF-10.

Design and development
Built from glassfibre, the Ximango is a low-wing cantilever monoplane with conventional landing gear and a T-tail. Powered by front-mounted 80 hp Limbach L2000 E01, it has an enclosed side-by-side cockpit for two. The wings fold for storage or transportation. The type could also be fitted with an alternate Imaer T2000 M1 engine. The type was developed into the Rotax-powered AMT-200 Super Ximango.

Specification

See also

References

Bibliography

External links

 .

1980s Brazilian sport aircraft
Motor gliders
Low-wing aircraft
Single-engined tractor aircraft
T-tail aircraft
Aircraft first flown in 1986